Aviva "Viv" Newton is a fictional character from the Australian Channel Seven soap opera Home and Away, played by Mouche Phillips. She made her first appearance on 5 July 1989 and departed on 25 May 1990.

Casting
When Phillips auditioned for the role of Viv she was living with established cast member Justine Clarke, who plays Roo Stewart. The producers left a message on Phillips answering machine telling her she had the part. Phillips said that she began filming the same week that Clarke finished filming and felt like they were doing a swap. Phillips said that her first day of filming was "dreadful". She told TV Week that "I felt like I was just warming up in a scene and they'd say 'done!. Phillips told a writer from Look-in that she liked to be kept busy on set. She explained that "people" were often left trying to find her because she was not where she should have been.

Character development
Karen Krizanovich from TV Guide said that the character has been created specifically to "bring a little glamour to the day-to-day lives at Summer Bay". In the Home and Away – Official Collector’s Edition a writer described Viv as a "feisty and beautiful" character. In one storyline Viv dates Matt Wilson (Greg Benson). They later break up because Matt is romancing other women and she gets back together with Steven Matheson (Adam Willits). In his book The who's who of soap operas; Anthony Howard said that Steven did not have the same sex appeal as Matt, but he was more "loving and reliable" to Viv.

The character was written out of Home and Away during 1990. Phillips told Graeme Kay from BIG! that the role had taken up too much of her time and she preferred having a free schedule.

Storylines
Viv meets Steven and Brian 'Dodge' Forbes (Kelly Dingwall) while they are in the city. Viv reveals she is running from her abusive father John (John Gregg), who is a reverend and Steven and Dodge take her back to Summer Bay. Lance Smart (Peter Vroom) and his mother, Colleen (Lyn Collingwood) agree to cover for Viv and lie that she is a relative staying with them.

The truth is revealed and John turns up looking for Viv and charms everybody. John manipulates Viv by using her younger sister, Tammy (Katy Edwards) in order to guilt trip her into returning home and she does. Once home, John locks Viv in a cupboard under the stairs. Tammy rescues her and phones Steven. Steven and Bobby Simpson (Nicolle Dickson) arrive to rescue Viv and Tammy and lock John in the cupboard as a taste of his own medicine and flee back to the bay. Bobby asks her father Donald Fisher (Norman Coburn) to let Viv and Tammy stay. Once Donald learns of John's true nature, he contacts Howard West (Richard Rowe), a representative of the Department of Child Services who offers Viv and Tammy the choice of going into a children's home or remaining with John under a supervision order. Tammy reluctantly agrees to return home while Viv remains with Donald and Bobby.

Viv finds herself the target of school bully Vicki Baxter (Nana Coburn) due to Donald being her headmaster as well as guardian. She then finds an ally in the newly arrived Emma Jackson (Dannii Minogue) who leads her into trouble and encourages her to rebel. While wagging school one afternoon, Viv and Emma hitch a ride with two unknown men who attempt to rape them but are quickly saved by Steven and Alf Stewart (Ray Meagher). Viv and Steven begin dating but Viv is afraid Steven wants to go further. Vicki tries to drive a wedge between the two but is unsuccessful.

Viv soon discovers that Tammy has fled their father and is on her way to Summer Bay and spends several days looking for her. Tammy is found and the sisters are reunited. Helen Wakefield (Shayne Foote), a social worker is able to locate Viv and Tammy's mother, Angela (Annie Byron) and brings her to meet her estranged daughters. Viv and Tammy are shocked as John had told them Angela had died. Angela explains that she left when Tammy was a baby and has been working on a lavender farm in Queensland. After a nervous reunion, the Newtons prepare to leave the bay and Viv and Steven agree to keep in contact. Viv later writes Steven a letter breaking off their relationship.

References

External links
 Character profile at the Internet Movie Database

Home and Away characters
Television characters introduced in 1989
Female characters in television